The House of Commons Commission is the overall supervisory body of the House of Commons Administration in the United Kingdom. The Commission is a corporate body established by the House of Commons (Administration) Act 1978 (c.36).  The Commission continues to exist during the dissolution period and the person who was Speaker continues in office as a member of the Commission until a Speaker is chosen by the new Parliament.

Responsibilities
The commission is responsible for the Administration Department and the departments of the Speaker, Clerk of the House of Commons, Serjeant at Arms, Library and Official Report of the House of Commons. Its responsibilities are:

Appointing staff of the House (excluding the Clerk of the House of Commons, Clerk Assistant, Serjeant at Arms, and Speaker's personal staff)
Preparing and laying before the House the Estimates for the House of Commons Service
Allocating functions to House departments
Maintenance of the Palace of Westminster and the Parliamentary Estate
Reporting annually to the House on its actions and on financial estimates for the financial year

Members of Parliament can question the spokesperson of the commission in the same way as they can question government ministers. The House of Commons Commission claims not to be a public authority for the purposes of the Freedom of Information Act 2000 or the Environmental Information Regulations 2004.

Delegated responsibilities
The commission delegates some of its statutory responsibilities to the House of Commons Executive Board. The House of Commons Executive Board manages day to day operations, including ensuring that staff terms and conditions are met consistently. The commission has no responsibility for pensions, allowances or salaries. Pensions are dealt with by the Members Estimate Committee. Salaries and allowances are considered by the Independent Parliamentary Standards Authority.

Membership
Commission membership was laid out in the House of Commons (Administration) Act 1978. Membership consisted of the Speaker of the House of Commons, the Leader of the House of Commons, a member of parliament appointed by the Leader and three members of parliament appointed by the House of Commons. The three members appointed by the House of Commons cannot also be Ministers of the Crown. Membership was updated by the House of Commons Commission Act 2015. The 2015 act expanded the Commission to include an additional member of parliament and four lay members.

The Speaker remains a member, despite a dissolution of Parliament, until a new Speaker is elected. Aside from the Leader of the House (who remains a member until a new Leader is appointed), the others also remain members during a dissolution unless they do not seek nomination as an MP or fail to be re-elected at the general election.

The membership of the Members Estimates Committee is identical to that of the Commission. However, because it is a committee, it ceases to exist during a dissolution of Parliament.

Current membership

Estimates and related committees
Currently, funding for the House of Commons is divided into two blocs: the Administration Estimate and the Members Estimate. The Administration Estimate provides for the Commons portion of the Parliamentary Estates, the Chamber, and Commons staff. The Commission takes direct responsibility for the Administration Estimate and is assisted by the Administration Audit Committee (made up of three MPs and outside three members) in auditing the Estimate.

The Members Estimate includes funds for MPs' pay, expenses, and staffs, as well as Short Money (financial assistance to opposition parties). The House of Commons created the Members Estimate Committee (MEC) to oversee it, but provided that its membership be the same as that of the Commission. The MEC has appointed a Members Estimate Audit Committee with the same membership as the Administration Audit Committee.

The House also created the Members' Allowances Committee to advise the MEC on its functions. It was also created to advise the MEC, Speaker, and Leader of the House on other allowances issues; to approve guidance for MPs on allowances, and to resolve questions regarding allowances rules referred by MPs.

With the creation of the Independent Parliamentary Standards Authority, funds for pay, allowances, and staffing are no longer part of the Members Estimate, reducing it by 80%. Because IPSA only took responsibility for MPs' pay during the 2010/11 financial year, there will still be a substantial Members' Estimate. But, the Director of General Resources has recommended folding the rump of the Members Estimate into the Administration Estimate beginning with 2011/12, and in their advice to the House of Commons during consideration of the bill that created IPSA, the members of the Estimates Audit Committees anticipated that would happen. Eliminating the Members Estimate would lead to the elimination of the MEC and Members Estimates Audit Committee, and quite possibly the Members' Allowances Committee.

Trade unions
The House recognises the FDA (which represents senior staff), Prospect, PCS and GMB, which represent staff of the House and collectively form the House's Trade Union Side (TUS). MPs' staff are not employees of the House of Commons Service, but of the individual Members for which they work. While Unite the Union has not been recognised under the Trade Union and Labour Relations Act for the purpose of collective bargaining with the House Service, the House Administration has agreed a draft memorandum of understanding with Unite and the Members' and Peers' Staff Association.

References

Committees of the British House of Commons